Rob Greenberg is an American writer.

Credits

Writing

Television
Animal Control (written by)
The Moodys (written by)
Spellbound (2004/I) (TV) (writer)
Harry's Girl (2003) (TV) (writer)
Spellbound (2003) (TV) (writer)
Bad Haircut (2001) (TV) (writer)
Frasier

Film
Meet Dave (2008) (written by)
Cloudy with a Chance of Meatballs (2009) (additional screenplay material)
Overboard (2018) (written by)
The Valet (2022) (written by)

Directing

Television
Animal Control
The Moodys
My Boys
How I Met Your Mother
Scrubs
Happy Endings
Worst Week
Mike Birbiglia's Secret Public Journal (2008 special)

Film
Overboard (2018)

Awards and nominations
Nominated for 4 Emmy Awards and 2 Writers Guild of America Awards.

References

External links

American film producers
American male screenwriters
American television directors
American television producers
American television writers
Primetime Emmy Award winners
Living people
Place of birth missing (living people)
Year of birth missing (living people)
Writers Guild of America Award winners
American male television writers